Enemies, A Love Story is a novel by Isaac Bashevis Singer first published serially in the Jewish Daily Forward on February 11, 1966. The English translation was published in 1972.

Plot summary
It's New York City, a few years after World War II. Herman Broder, a Jewish man who has lost his faith but still enjoys Talmudic scholarship, is married to a Polish woman named Yadwiga Pracz, not of Jewish origin, who had worked as a servant in his father's family in Poland and had kept Herman alive, during the Holocaust, by hiding him in a hayloft in her native village. Almost all Herman's family perished in the Holocaust, including, he believes, his first wife, Tamara, whom an eyewitness told him was shot, along with the couple's two children. Broder married Yadwiga after he received a visa for America, perhaps partly out of a sense of obligation. He brought her to Brooklyn, and in their apartment in Coney Island, she works diligently as a homemaker, learning how to cook such Jewish foods as matzo balls with borscht, carp's head, and challah, but although there are moments of tenderness between them, it isn't a happy union. He calls her a "peasant" to her face and mocks her wish to convert to Judaism. He has told her that he works as a book salesman and that he has to travel for his job up and down the Eastern seaboard, but in fact he works as a ghost-writer for a rabbi in Manhattan named Milton Lampert, who's a showboat and a schemer, and the nights that Yadwiga thinks he's on the road, he is in fact spending in the Bronx, where he pays rent on a second apartment for his mistress, Masha, who is a concentration camp survivor, and her mother, a pious woman named Shifrah Puah. Herman isolates himself from the larger Jewish community, in part because he is haunted by the Holocaust—he often daydreams about what it would be like to have to live for years in whatever room he happens to be in—in part because he is ashamed of his somewhat disreputable line of work, and in part because he wants to hide his double life with Yadwiga and Masha. That romantic arrangement becomes even more complicated when Herman reads his name in a classified ad in a Yiddish newspaper, answers it, and learns that Tamara is alive and in New York City. The comedy of the novel consists in Herman's doomed attempts to keep his three wives from knowing about one another; the tragedy is in the inability of Herman and other characters to make the accommodations and compromises that would reconcile them to their survival.

Critical reception
The New York Times wrote that "Singer's marvelously pointed humor has turned black and bitter, the sex is flat, and there is little irony or selfconsciousness," and condemned Enemies as "a bleak, obsessive novel that offers neither release nor hope." The Times Literary Supplement (London), on the other hand, praised the novel's "larger moral subtleties" and considered it "a fine addition to a legendary body of work," and the New York Review of Books, after noting that Enemies was "a religious novel in its way," wrote that the book "adds to invention, wit, and observation the sympathetic imagination of a writer of genius and an understanding of the important but cruelly narrow possibilities of this world."

Adaptations
The book was adapted for the theater by Sarah Schulman and premiered at the Wilma Theater in Philadelphia in 2007.

An eponymous film, based on the book and directed by Paul Mazursky, was released in 1989.

The novel was adapted as an opera by Ben Moore; it premiered at Palm Beach Opera in 2015.

In 2022, the originally serialized novel was released for the first time in book format in standard Yiddish by the Swedish publisher Olniansky Tekst Farlag. Mario Moishele Alfonso transcribed the whole book into standard Yiddish from online copies of the Forverts, and the book was edited by Emil Kalin and Nikolaj Olniansky.

References

1966 American novels
Yiddish-language literature
American novels adapted into films
Novels by Isaac Bashevis Singer
Fiction set in 1949
Novels set in New York City
Novels first published in serial form
Novels adapted into operas
Interfaith romance in fiction
Adultery in novels